Jay Lawrence is an American politician and a former Republican member of the Arizona House of Representatives who represented District 23 from January 2015 to January 2021. Lawrence was a talk show host at KTAR radio for 26 years.

Elections
 2016 Lawrence and Michelle Ugenti were unopposed in the Republican primary. They defeated Democrat Tammy Caputi on November 8. Lawrence was the second vote getter in the election with 64,903 votes.
 2014 Lawrence and Michelle Ugenti defeated Effie Carlson and Bob Littlefield in the Republican primary and were unchallenged in the general election.

References

External links
 Official page  at the Arizona State Legislature
 Ballotpedia Page

Place of birth missing (living people)
Living people
Republican Party members of the Arizona House of Representatives
Politicians from Scottsdale, Arizona
21st-century American politicians
Year of birth missing (living people)